Velutina velutina, common name the velvet shell, is a species of small sea snail with a transparent shell, a marine gastropod mollusk in the family Velutinidae.

Description

The maximum body size is from 15 to 50 mm. The maximum recorded shell length is 27.5 mm.

Distribution
The distribution of Velutina velutina is circumboreal. The range of Velutina velutina include: 72.78°N to 42°N; 70°W to 0°W.

Distribution of Velutina velutina include:
 Greenland: West Greenland.
 Canada: Labrador, Nova Scotia, New Brunswick
 USA: Maine, Massachusetts, including Cobscook Bay

Ecology 
The habitat of Velutina velutina include bathyal, infralittoral and circalittoral of the Gulf and estuary. Minimum recorded depth is 0 m. Maximum recorded depth is 183 m.

Velutina velutina feeds on ascidians.

Sexes are separate but are seldom conspicuously different externally. Velutina velutina is a simultaneous hermaphrodite yet self-fertilization is prevented due to various morphological, physiological, or behavioral mechanisms. They shed their eggs.

References
This article incorporates CC-BY-SA-3.0 text from the reference.

External links
 Robert Hugh Morris, Donald Putnam Abbott, Eugene Clinton Haderlie. Intertidal Invertebrates of California, p. 273, 13.66. Velutina sp., V. velutina (Müller, 1776), Smooth Velutina. Stanford University Press, 1st ed., Stanford (CA, USA) 1980. (Google Books)

Velutinidae
Gastropods described in 1776
Taxa named by Otto Friedrich Müller